Omorphina is a genus of moths of the monotypic tribe Omorphini of the subfamily Plusiinae.

Species
 Omorphina aurantiaca Alphéraky, 1892

References
 Natural History Museum Lepidoptera genus database
 Omorphina at funet.fi

Plusiinae